The Observer-Dispatch (The O-D) is the largest newspaper serving the Utica-Rome metropolitan area in  Central New York, circulating in Oneida County, Herkimer County, and parts of Madison County.  Based in Utica, New York, the publication is owned by Gannett.

History

Eliasaph Dorchester founded the weekly Utica Observer in 1817. The paper briefly moved to Rome, New York and published under the name of the Oneida Observer, but returned to Utica after. The paper consolidated with the Utica Democrat in 1852, bringing with it long-time editor Dewitt C. Grove, who simultaneously served as mayor of Utica from 1860 to 1862. The Observer'''s facilities were destroyed in 1884 by a fire. Construction began in 1914 on a new office for the Observer, which was completed in 1915. The two-story building was expanded to three stories in 1930, with the name "Utica Observer-Dispatch" engraved in the stone above the third story windows.

In 1922 the paper was purchased by Frank E. Gannett, founder of the Gannett Company. Gannett purchased the Herald-Dispatch at the same time and combined the two, creating the Utica Observer-Dispatch. Gannet also purchased the Utica Daily Press in 1935.  The Utica Daily Press and the Utica Observer-Dispatch merged in 1987, and were renamed to the current Observer-Dispatch. Gannett owned the newspaper until 2007, when it was purchased by GateHouse Media. GateHouse Media's parent company merged with Gannett in 2019, returning the Observer-Dispatch to Gannett once more.

In the late 1990s and early 2000s, the O-D had a weekly Bosnian language column serving the Bosnian American population in Utica.

The company added digital delivery of news and information in January 2000 with the launch of uticaOD.com. It began online video publication in 2006.

In 2004, the Observer-Dispatch purchased the Mid York Weekly newspaper, serving Hamilton, New York, and seven weekly Pennysaver publications, which are mailed throughout Oneida and Herkimer counties. The Observer-Dispatch shares an editor with The Times Telegram, a sister Gannett paper in nearby Herkimer County.

In March 2022, the Observer-Dispatch building was purchased by a real estate investment group.

Awards
The Utica Daily Press and the Utica Observer-Dispatch'' were jointly awarded the 1959 Pulitzer Prize for Public Service:

References

External links
Observer-Dispatch | uticaOD.com

Daily newspapers published in New York (state)
Pulitzer Prize-winning newspapers
Utica, New York
Rome, New York
Publications established in 1817
1817 establishments in New York (state)
Pulitzer Prize for Public Service winners
Gannett publications